Joachim Nagel (born 31 May 1966) is a German economist and current President of the Bundesbank. Before he was a senior manager of the Bank for International Settlements since 2020, having been a member of the board of the Deutsche Bundesbank from 2010 to 2016 and then a member of the board of the KfW Bankengruppe from 2017 to 2020 . He was appointed President of the Deutsche Bundesbank on 1 January 2022, succeeding Jens Weidmann who resigned.

Early life 
After graduating from the Otto-Hahn-Gymnasium Karlsruhe, Nagel studied economics at the Karlsruhe Institute of Technology. After graduating in 1991, he worked there as a research assistant and later a consultant for economic and financial policy at the Social Democratic Party (SPD) in Bonn from March to October 1994.

Banking career
In 1999 Nagel moved to the Bundesbank, initially as Head of the Office of the President of the then State Central Bank in Bremen, Lower Saxony and Saxony-Anhalt in Hanover. In 2003 he moved to the headquarters of the Bundesbank in Frankfurt am Main. In 2008 he became head of the central department Markets. In December 2010, he replaced Thilo Sarrazin, who had resigned, on the board of directors of the Deutsche Bundesbank. On April 30, 2016, he resigned from the Executive Board of the Deutsche Bundesbank.

On November 1, 2016, he joined the KFW Bankengruppe, the largest public development bank in Germany, as a general manager and then from 2017 to 2020 as Executive Board member. At the same time he was chairman of the supervisory board of KfW IPEX-Bank and first deputy chairman of the supervisory board of DEG German investment and development company.

From 2018 to 2020 he was also a member of the Supervisory Board of Deutsche Börse AG.

On November 1, 2020, Nagel became a member of the management of the Bank for International Settlements as Deputy Head of Banking.

Bundesbank presidency
On December 20, 2021, the German President Frank-Walter Steinmeier announced Nagel's appointment as successor to Jens Weidmann as president of the Deutsche Bundesbank. He assumed the position on 1 January 2022.

Personal life
Joachim Nagel is married and has two children. He is a member of the SPD.

References 

Presidents of the Deutsche Bundesbank
1966 births
Social Democratic Party of Germany politicians
Karlsruhe Institute of Technology alumni
German bankers
People from Karlsruhe
Living people